A louage is a minibus share taxi in Tunisia. In French, the name means "rental." Departing only when filled with passengers not at specific times, they can be hired at stations. Louage ply set routes, and fares are set by the government.

In contrast to other share taxis in Africa, louage are sparsely decorated. These white vans sport a single colored stripe that alerts potential passengers to the type of transport they offer. Red-striped vans travel from one state to another, Blue which travels from city to city within a state, and yellow which serves rural locales. Blue-striped louage can also be seen. Small placards atop the vans specify either a van's exact destination or the town in which it is registered.
In 2014, a one and a half hour trip cost about US$2, and an intra-city journey, approximately US$1.

At some louage stations, tickets can be purchased at a booth and given to the driver, although  this practice was rarely followed.

Prior to the introduction of vans, French-made station wagons were used as louage.

References

Share taxis
Public transport in Tunisia
Transport in Tunisia